First MTR South Western Trains Limited, trading as South Western Railway (SWR), is a British train operating company owned by FirstGroup (70%) and MTR Corporation (30%) that operates the South Western franchise.

During March 2017, it was announced that SWR had been awarded the South Western franchise. On 20 August 2017, it took over operations from the previous franchisee South West Trains. SWR operates commuter services from its Central London terminus at London Waterloo to south west London. SWR provides suburban services in the counties of Surrey, Hampshire and Dorset, as well as regional services in Devon, Somerset, Berkshire and Wiltshire. Its subsidiary Island Line operates services on the Isle of Wight. Rolling stock changes have included a comprehensive refurbishment of existing units and the acquisition of new-build Class 701 units from Bombardier to replace SWR's Class 455, Class 456 and Class 707 multiple units. The Class 483 fleet operated on the Island Line was also replaced by the Class 484 during 2021.

During April 2018, amid concerns of SWR's performance, the Transport Secretary, Chris Grayling, announced an independent review into SWR and Network Rail. Between 2 December 2019 and 2 January 2020, the National Union of Rail, Maritime and Transport Workers (RMT) undertook 27days of strikes. Further industrial action by SWR's staff was undertaken in 2022. In response to the decrease in passenger travel caused by the COVID-19 pandemic, SWR had considerably curtailed its services by mid-2020. In January 2020, SWR announced that they were in discussions with the government regarding the future of the franchise. In December 2020, it was announced that SWR's franchise would be abolished and replaced by a shorter management contract. In February 2023, the contract was extended to May 2025.

History 
During July 2015, the Department for Transport (DfT) abandoned efforts to negotiate an extension with the incumbent operator of the South Western franchise, South West Trains, (owned by British transport conglomerate Stagecoach) and announced that the South Western franchise would be retendered for in the coming years.

In February 2016, the DfT announced that two companies, FirstGroup and Stagecoach, had been shortlisted to bid for the next South Western franchise. During June 2016, MTR Corporation partnered with FirstGroup in their bid, taking a 30% shareholding in the joint venture. During July 2016, the DfT issued the Invitation to Tender.

During March 2017, the DfT announced that the South Western franchise had been awarded to First/MTR. At the time, it was stated that its franchise period was to commence from 20 August 2017 and run through to 18 August 2024, although the deal had included an option for the DfT to extend it for a further 48 weeks.

The Competition & Markets Authority (CMA) held an inquiry into the awarding; during July 2017, it sought undertakings from SWR that it would not abuse its monopoly on services to the West of England, Dorset and Somerset, as FirstGroup also operated the Greater Western franchise in those regions. FirstGroup and MTR responded with an offer to implement a cap upon unregulated fares between London and Exeter as a mitigating measure; the CMA chose to accept this concession.

By April 2018, concerns had reportedly grown over SWR's performance over previous months; there had been a noted rise in both the number of delayed services and outright cancellations. Due to these concerns, the Transport Secretary, Chris Grayling, announced an independent review into the performance of South Western Railway and Network Rail; the review was welcomed by Winchester's MP, Steve Brine. During July 2018, reports emerged that FirstGroup/MTR were in the process of renegotiating the SWR contract, allegedly due to the operator's inability to deliver on many of its promised improvements, as well as its declining performance and industrial action by its own staff.

Between 2 December 2019 and 2 January 2020, the National Union of Rail, Maritime and Transport Workers (RMT) undertook 27days of strikes. These were in protest to the potential introduction of DOO (driver only operation) on SWR's new fleet of Bombardier-built Class 701 multiple units, which would thereby nullify the role of the guard.

In January 2020, SWR announced that they were in discussions with the government regarding the future of the franchise following a £137million loss, with termination of the contract being a possibility.

By mid-2020, SWR had considerably curtailed its services in response to the significant decline of passenger travel amid the COVID-19 pandemic. From 15 June 2020, both passengers and staff on public transport in England, including SWR services, were required to wear face coverings while travelling, and that anyone failing to do so would be liable to be refused travel or fined.

In December 2020, it was announced that terms for the abolition of the franchise system for SWR had been agreed, and that the company would be given a management contract to run until 1 April 2023 when the ERMA (Emergency Recovery Measures Agreement) for the franchise ends in March 2021. During October 2021, the contract was updated with a finish date of 28 May 2023, with an option to extend further if required by the DfT.
In February 2023 the contract was further extended until May 2025.

SWR is one of several train operators impacted by the 2022–2023 United Kingdom railway strikes, which are the first national rail strikes in the UK for three decades. Its workers are amongst those who are participating in industrial action due to a dispute over pay and working conditions. SWR is capable of operating a minimal timetable on any of the planned dates for the strikes due to the number of staff involved.

Services 
South Western Railway is the main operator for western Surrey, Hampshire and Dorset, and also serves London, Berkshire, Wiltshire, Somerset and Devon.

Most SWR services run on electrified lines using the 750 V DC third-rail system. There is a diesel fleet for services on the West of England line to Salisbury and Exeter, using the unelectrified track beyond Worting Junction just west of Basingstoke, and for Salisbury to Southampton via Romsey services which also serve Eastleigh. SWR operates almost 1,700 train services per day.

From , SWR's London terminus, long-distance trains run to southern England, including the major coastal population centres of Portsmouth, Southampton, Bournemouth, Poole and Weymouth. The majority of its passengers are on suburban commuter lines in inner and south-west London, Surrey, east Berkshire, and north-east Hampshire.

As with most rail companies, non-folding bicycles are banned from peak-time trains to and from London. However, these restrictions apply only to cyclists boarding or alighting in the area bounded by Hook, Alton, Guildford, Reading and Dorking, in order to maximise available passenger space on the most crowded trains.

Mainline services
South Western Railway operates regular services on four mainline routes:
 The South West Main Line (SWML) runs between London (Waterloo station) and the town of Weymouth; the route passes through several large towns and cities, including Woking, Basingstoke, Winchester, Southampton, Bournemouth, Poole and Dorchester. South Western Railway operates trains along the entire length of the line. Almost all trains operated by the company start from or terminate at London Waterloo with the exception of a Winchester - Bournemouth / Poole stopping service; these include semi-fast services to/from Southampton and Poole, and express services to/from Weymouth. There are also trains to and from Portsmouth; these trains branch off the SWML at Eastleigh, then proceed via the Eastleigh to Fareham and West Coastway lines to Portsmouth Harbour station.
 The Portsmouth Direct Line (PDL) branches off the SWML at Woking and runs to Portsmouth via Guildford, Haslemere, Petersfield and Havant. South Western Railway operates all passenger trains on this route; these include fast and semi-fast services between London and Portsmouth, and semi-fast services as far as Haslemere.
 The West of England Main Line (WEML) is the only mainline route that is not fully electrified. It leaves the SWML at Basingstoke and runs to Exeter via Andover, Salisbury, Gillingham and Yeovil. South Western Railway is the only operator on the line, with most services running between London and either Salisbury or Exeter St Davids. Some peak-time services terminate at various other destinations on the line, including Gillingham and Andover. On Summer Saturdays, there is also a daily return service to Weymouth, which leaves the WEML at Yeovil Junction and continues via the Heart of Wessex Line.
It is the shortest of the four mainline routes and as such it is sometimes considered an outer suburban route instead (however for ticketing purposes, it is classed as a mainline route). Services usually run the full length of the line between London and Alton, though some services terminate at Farnham.

In total, there are 14 mainline trains per hour departing London Waterloo in the off-peak; this number increases in the peak hours. The majority of mainline services are operated by Class 444 or Class 450 EMUs, except for the West of England Main Line which is always operated by Class 158 or Class 159 DMUs (because it is unelectrified) and the Alton Line which also sees the occasional use of Class 458 units.

Metro and Suburban services
South Western Railway also operates many suburban "Metro" services in and around London. All services on the suburban part of the network are operated by Class 450, Class 455, Class 456, Class 458 and Class 707 electric multiple units.

Via Putney
The main route via Putney is known as the Waterloo to Reading Line. It runs between London and Reading and passes through towns such as Staines-upon-Thames, Ascot and Bracknell. It operates as a fast service as far as Staines, with Reading trains only calling at Clapham Junction, Richmond, Twickenham and Feltham. Branch lines on this route include:
Most services on the branch run either between London and Weybridge (described below), or run in a loop from Waterloo to Waterloo via Brentford, Whitton and Richmond (these services run both clockwise and anticlockwise).
 The Kingston Loop Line, which branches off at Twickenham, runs via Kingston and joins the South West Main Line at New Malden. Most services on this line run in an anticlockwise loop, from Waterloo to Waterloo, via Putney, Strawberry Hill, Kingston and Wimbledon.
 There is also a branch line to Shepperton, however, this is only served by Putney trains at peak times.
 The Staines to Windsor Line, which branches off the main line at Staines-upon-Thames and runs to Windsor & Eton Riverside station. Most services run semi-fast between London and Windsor.
 The Chertsey Branch Line, which leaves the main line at Virginia Water and runs to Weybridge. Most services on the line run between London and Weybridge via the Hounslow Loop Line; a few services are extended beyond Weybridge, to and from Woking.
 The Ascot to Guildford Line, which is only served by through trains at peak times; these services run between London and Aldershot.

A total of 12 trains per hour run between London Waterloo and Putney in the off-peak; this number increases in peak hours.

Via Wimbledon
The main route via Wimbledon uses the slow tracks of the quadruple-track South West Main Line. Suburban trains run along the mainline between London and Woking. Branch lines on this route include:
 The Mole Valley Line, which branches off the main line at Raynes Park and runs via Epsom to Leatherhead, where the branch line itself splits into two lines: one to Guildford and one to Horsham via Dorking. SWR runs regular services to both Guildford and Dorking; the section between Dorking and Horsham is operated by Southern.
 The Chessington Branch Line branches off the Mole Valley Line at Motspur Park and runs to Chessington.
 The Kingston Loop Line, which leaves the SWML at New Malden, runs via Kingston and joins the Waterloo to Reading line at Twickenham. Most services on this line run in a clockwise loop, from Waterloo to Waterloo, via Wimbledon, Kingston, Strawberry Hill and Putney.
 The Shepperton Branch Line, which branches off the Kingston Loop Line at Teddington. Most services on the branch line run between Waterloo and Shepperton via Wimbledon.
 The Hampton Court Branch Line, which leaves the main line at Surbiton and runs directly to Hampton Court.
 The New Guildford Line, which also branches off at Surbiton, running to Guildford via Claygate. The line joins the Guildford branch of the Mole Valley Line at Effingham Junction.

A total of 16 trains per hour run between London Waterloo and Wimbledon in the off-peak; this number increases in peak hours.

Other services
Routes that do not start or terminate at London Waterloo include:
 The Ascot to Guildford Line, which runs between Ascot and Guildford via Aldershot. Most services on the line run only between Ascot and Guildford, with no extension in either direction; however, some peak-time services do run between London and Farnham via Ascot. The shuttle services are usually operated by Class 450 units.
 The western section of the West Coastway Line between Portsmouth and Southampton. Class 450 units are usually in operation on this route.
 The Eastleigh to Romsey Line between Romsey and Eastleigh. Services on the line are extended beyond Eastleigh to and from Salisbury via Southampton Central and Romsey, in effect calling at Romsey twice. These services are operated using Class 158 units.
 The Wessex Main Line between Salisbury and Southampton. Services are extended beyond Southampton via the Eastleigh to Romsey Line, as described above.
 The Lymington Branch Line between Brockenhurst and Lymington Pier runs every 30 minutes between these two stations. This is done entirely by Class 450 units on this line.
 The Island Line on the Isle of Wight, between Ryde Pier Head station and Shanklin. These services are operated using former London Underground Class 484 converted from London Underground D78 stock.

Service table
Details of each route, including maps and timetables, are on the South Western Railway official website (see External links below). As of December 2022, its routes off-peak Monday to Friday, with frequencies in trains per hour (tph), include:

Future services 
Improvements promised under the 2017 contract were:
 Refurbished trains
 Journeys to London eight minutes faster from Southampton, nine minutes faster from Bournemouth, ten minutes faster from Exeter and 14 minutes faster from Weymouth
 Free Wi-Fi at all stations and on mainland trains
 29 additional weekday and Saturday services between Portsmouth & Southsea and Southampton Central
 Hourly direct trains from Weymouth to Portsmouth to begin before 2019
 35 additional weekday and Saturday services between Portsmouth & Southsea and London Waterloo
 More Sunday services
 Investment in stations, including improvements to Southampton Central station
 Live information on seating availability and crowding levels via a new mobile phone app

, there is also an hourly Sunday service between Reading and Salisbury via Basingstoke (with trains running between morning and evening).

In August 2021, the company announced the launch of "assisted boarding points" at all 189 stations on its network, allowing disabled or elderly passengers to ask for assistance onboard trains with as little as ten minutes' notice. The scheme will include clear signage at stations, with QR codes allowing customers to send details of the assistance they require and their planned journey to staff, replacing older systems wherein assisted journeys had to be booked six hours to a day in advance.

Rolling stock 
South Western Railway inherited a fleet of Classes 158, 159, 444, 450, 455, 456, 458 and 707 from South West Trains, and subsequently re-introduced Class 442 trains which had operated on Gatwick Express after earlier service with South West Trains. The current fleet for the Island Line, Class 484, entered service on 1 November 2021.

During March 2020, the Class 442 fleet was withdrawn; one year later, SWR decided that they would not be returned to service and their re-introduction has been cancelled.

Current fleet

Future fleet 

Following delays caused by the COVID-19 pandemic and software faults, the new trains will be deployed in 2023. , 24 of the 90 trains ordered has been accepted from Alstom.

Past fleet 
Train types formerly operated by South Western Railway include:

 Class 483, all withdrawn from service on 3 January 2021 after 82 years of service, including their time with London Transport.
 Class 442, permanently withdrawn in April 2021.
 Class 456 withdrawn from service 17 January 2022.

Depots 
Nine train depots and stabling sidings are located across London and south west England for servicing and maintaining the South Western Railway fleet.

Bournemouth 
Bournemouth depot is southwest of Bournemouth station, occupying the approach to the former Bournemouth West station. Until their withdrawal in February 2007, the depot was home to the Class 442 (5Wes) Wessex Electrics, and became so again during their reintroduction from 2019 to 2021. The branch turns off at Branksome station where trains can be seen stopping at platform 2 and reversing into the depot.

Farnham 
Farnham Traincare Depot, in Weydon Lane, was opened by the Southern Railway at the time of the electrification of the Portsmouth and  lines in 1937. It was refurbished for the introduction of modern units when slam-door trains were replaced circa 2005. At the same time, disused quarry and ballast dump sidings behind the carriage shed were removed and a number of outdoor sidings were laid for overnight storage and servicing of units.

Feltham 
Feltham depot was completed in 2021; it is intended to provide stabling for the Class 701 units.

Fratton 
Fratton Traincare Depot is located on central Portsea Island, alongside Fratton station. It has a carriage washer and is the fuelling point for the 158s and 159s. The depot has a train shed with two pitted roads for maintenance of rolling stock. Class 444 and 450 units berth overnight. Stabling sidings and bay platforms at Portsmouth & Southsea station are co-ordinated from the depot.

Northam 
Northam Traincare Facility was built by Siemens in 2002 as the home depot for the Desiro fleet as part of a 20-year maintenance contract. It is located south of St Denys station and is near Southampton Football Club's St Mary's Stadium.

Ryde 
Ryde Traincare Depot, alongside Ryde St John's Road on the Isle of Wight serviced the Class 483 units that used to operate on the Island Line.

This has been refitted to allow the new Class 484 to be serviced.

Salisbury 
Salisbury depot provides servicing for the South Western Railway diesel fleet.

Strawberry Hill 
Strawberry Hill train maintenance depot in south west London, was built in 1897, is inside the triangular junction of the Shepperton Branch Line with the Kingston Loop Line, just yards from Strawberry Hill railway station.

Wimbledon 
Wimbledon Traincare Depot is located between Wimbledon and Earlsfield stations, on the main line to Waterloo, next to the Wimbledon railway viaduct. It is currently the home of the Class 455, 456, 458/5 and 707 fleets, although other classes from the SWR fleet berth overnight there.

References

External links 

 

British companies established in 2017
FirstGroup railway companies
MTR Corporation
Railway companies established in 2017
Railway operators in London
Rail transport in Devon
Rail transport in Dorset
Rail transport in Hampshire
Rail transport in Surrey
Rail transport in Somerset
Rail transport in Wiltshire
Rail transport on the Isle of Wight
Train operating companies in the United Kingdom
2017 establishments in England